Baron Eberhardt Otto George von Bock (died 21 January 1814) was a Hanoverian born major-general in the British army during the Napoleonic Wars.

Biography
Bock was descended from an old military family, and entered the Hanoverian cavalry about the year 1781. His name appears as a premier-lieutenant in the 6th Hanoverian dragoons in 1789, and as rittmeister (captain) in 1800. He served in the Hanoverian Garde du Corps under Freytag in the Flanders Campaign and was slightly wounded by two sabre cuts on the arm and head at the Battle of Famars 23 May 1793.

On the dissolution of the Hanoverian army after the convention of Artlenburg, Bock was one of the officers who travelled to England, where he raised four troops of heavy cavalry, designated as the 1st dragoons, King's German Legion, and was gazetted colonel 21 April 1804. The regiment was formed at Weymouth, and was a particular favourite of George III. Bock served at its head in Lord Cathcart's expedition to Hanover in 1805; also in Ireland, whither it was sent after its return home. From Ireland Bock, who had attained the rank of major-general in 1810, proceeded to the Peninsular War in 1811 in command of a brigade composed of the two heavy cavalry regiments of the Legion, with which he made the subsequent campaigns in Spain and the south of France in 1812–13. The steadiness and gallantry of Bock's heavy Germans often won approval, particularly on 23 July 1812, the day after the victory at Salamanca, when in a charge at Garcia Hernandez, they attacked, broke and made prisoner three battalions of French infantry formed in square, usually thought of as a formation impregnable to cavalry.

Bock was made temporary commander of Wellington's Cavalry during Cotton's convalescence July–October 1812, and again December 1812-June 1813. He served in the rearguard during the retreat from Burgos 1812, mishandling an ambush at Venta del Pozo (Villadrigo) 23 October. In 1813 he served at Vitoria 21 June.

Bock suffered from being very short sighted - before the charge at Garcia Hernandez he had to ask to be pointed in the direction of the enemy.

On 21 January 1814, Bock was drowned together with his son Lewis and other officers when the transport ship Bellona was wrecked on the Tulbest rocks, en route to England. His body was washed on shore at the little Breton village of Pleubian and interred.

Notes

References

Attribution

Year of birth missing
18th-century births
1814 deaths
British Army major generals
British Army commanders of the Napoleonic Wars
King's German Legion
British military personnel killed in action in the Napoleonic Wars
Barons of Germany
People who died at sea
German military personnel of the French Revolutionary Wars